Calytrix pimeleoides is a species of plant in the myrtle family Myrtaceae that is endemic to Western Australia.

It usually blooms between August and October producing cream-white star-shaped flowers.

Found on sand plains, flats and hils or among rocky outcrops in an area along the west coast of the Mid West region of Western Australia around Northampton where it grows on sandy soils.

References

Plants described in 2004
pimeleoides
Flora of Western Australia
Taxa named by Gregory John Keighery